Pritchard Park is a  former Superfund environmental cleanup site on the shore of Bainbridge Island's Eagle Harbor in Washington state.

The Bainbridge Island Japanese American Exclusion Memorial is within the park.

History
The Pacific Creosoting Company, later known as Wyckoff Company, occupied the site until the 1980s, and supported the community of Creosote. Government agencies estimate that  of creosote still remain in the ground at the site, after more than $100 million in environmental remediation.

Acquisition of the property was made by a partnership including Bainbridge Island Land Trust, Bainbridge Island Metropolitan Park and Recreation District, the City of Bainbridge Island, the Suquamish Tribe, the Bainbridge Island Japanese American Community, and The Trust for Public Land. Purchase by City of Bainbridge Island was completed in early 2006.

Naming
The park is named for Congressman and Lieutenant Governor of Washington Joel Pritchard.

References

Sources

External links

Parks in Kitsap County, Washington
Bainbridge Island, Washington